Benjamin Webster (April 14, 1867 – March 15, 1923) was a member of the Wisconsin State Assembly.

Biography
Webster was born on April 14, 1867, in Platteville, Wisconsin. He died there on March 15, 1923.

Career
Webster was a member of the Assembly during the 1917 session. Previously, he had been postmaster of Platteville from 1898 to 1914. At the time of his death, Webster was mayor of Platteville, having been elected in 1922. He was a Republican.

References

People from Platteville, Wisconsin
Republican Party members of the Wisconsin State Assembly
Mayors of places in Wisconsin
Wisconsin postmasters
1867 births
1923 deaths